NIC-1 is a national highway located in Nicaragua. The highway begins in the south just behind the Palacio de la Cultura with the NIC-4 in the section of Carretera Norte in Managua until it ends in the north near Somoto on the border with Honduras, and continuing as CA-1.

References

Managua
Roads in Nicaragua